This is a list of flag bearers who have represented Serbia and Montenegro (from 1996 to 2002 Federal Republic of Yugoslavia) at the Olympics.

List of flag bearers 
Flag bearers carry the national flag of their country at the opening ceremony of the Olympic Games.

Key

See also
Serbia and Montenegro at the Olympics
List of flag bearers for Yugoslavia at the Olympics
List of flag bearers for Serbia at the Olympics
List of flag bearers for Montenegro at the Olympics

References

Serbia and Montenegro at the Olympics
Serbia and Montenegro
Olympic flagbearers